Darwall-Smith is an English-language surname and may be:

 John Darwall-Smith (1912–1976), an English cricketer. 
 Randle Darwall-Smith (1914–1999), an English cricketer. 
 Robin Darwall-Smith, an English archivist.

See also
 Darwall
 Smith

English-language surnames